Weeraratna is a Sri Lankan surname. Notable people with the surname include:

 Ashani Weeraratna (born 1970/1971), American-South African cancer researcher
 Asoka Weeraratna (1918–1999), Sri Lankan Buddhist missionary
 Sean Weeraratna (born 1985), Scottish cricketer

Sinhalese surnames